Clorets is a line of chewing gum and mints made by Cadbury Adams.  It was introduced in 1951. Clorets gum and candy contain Actizol, a proprietary ingredient that contains chlorophyll, which purportedly acts as an active ingredient to eliminate mouth odors. Clorets was originally owned by The Warner-Lambert Company under its Adams division until Pfizer took over in 2000. The Adams division was sold to Cadbury-Schweppes in 2003, which is now known as Cadbury Adams (later acquired by Kraft Foods).

Clorets is widely available in South America, Central America, South Africa, West Asia and South-East Asia. The largest markets for Clorets are Mexico, Thailand, Egypt, Morocco and Japan.

Packaging and flavour varieties 
Packaging sizes
 Gum in 2s carton
 Gum in 12s carton
 Small mints (in a pack of 50)
 Candy-style mints (in a pack of 6)
 Tablet mints (in a pack of 35)
 Val-U-Pak (in a pack of 30)
Flavours
 Original/Cool Mint
 Arctic/Ocean Mint
 Orange Mint
 Dark Secret Mint (Thailand)
 Cinnamon (Japan)
 Cool Berry Mint
 Pink Grapefruit Mint
Clorets Infinity
 Peppermint
 Spearmint

See also
 List of chewing gum brands
 List of breath mints

References

Further reading
 
 
 
 

Chewing gum
Breath mints
Cadbury Adams brands
Products introduced in 1951
Mondelez International brands